Stephanie Anne Pearl-McPhee (a.k.a. The Yarn Harlot; born June 14, 1968) is a writer, knitter, International Board Certified Lactation Consultant (IBCLC), and doula living in Toronto, Ontario, Canada.

Life
Pearl-McPhee's grandmother, a professional knitter, taught her to knit when she was four years old. She has three daughters, one grandson and one granddaughter, and a granddaughter who died as a baby. Her husband, Joe, is a record producer.

Work

Pearl-McPhee has contributed articles and patterns to knitting magazines such as Cast On, Interweave Knits, Knitty, Stranded, and Spin-Off. She also contributed a chapter to the book Knitlit Too. In addition, she has written eight books on knitting.

She has been described as a knitting humourist.

One of Pearl-McPhee's best known works is her blog, which also carries the moniker "The Yarn Harlot". In 2004, she founded Tricoteuses sans Frontières (Knitters without Borders), a group dedicated to raising money for the non-profit Médecins Sans Frontières (Doctors without Borders). As of the 6th anniversary of Pearl-McPhee's blog (January 2010), they have contributed over $1,000,000 CAD to MSF/DWB.

Pearl-McPhee has protested against cuts to library services.

In 2006, she started the 2006 Knitting Olympics, a competition for knitters to start and finish one challenging project during the timeframe of the 2006 Winter Olympics. Over 4,000 knitters worldwide participated.

Pearl-McPhee often makes personal appearances at conventions, book stores and other craft-related events where she shares her view of life and knitting with fellow crafters.

Pearl-McPhee originated the word kinnear on August 2, 2007, on her blog. Now cited in the Urban Dictionary and in The New York Times' 2007 Word in Review, it is defined as "kinnear v. To take a candid photograph surreptitiously, especially by holding the camera low and out of the line of sight." Kinnearing was originated when she attempted to take a picture of Greg Kinnear at an airport while on her way to Boston, MA. When Kinnear learned of this, he started to try kinnearing others, including his Flash of Genius costar, Alan Alda. He showed his attempts on Late Night with Conan O'Brien, where, in the same interview, he declared that Pearl-McPhee is "the Michael Jordan of knitting."

Books
Knitlit Too (contributor), 2004, 
 Yarn Harlot: The Secret Life of a Knitter, 2005, 
At Knit's End: Meditations for Women Who Knit Too Much, 2005, 
Knitting Rules!: The Yarn Harlot's Bag of Knitting Tricks, 2006, 
Stephanie Pearl-McPhee Casts Off: The Yarn Harlot's Guide to the Land of Knitting, 2007, 
Things I Learned from Knitting (Whether I Wanted To or Not), 2008, 
 Free-Range Knitter: The Yarn Harlot Writes Again, 2008, 
All Wound Up, 2011,

References

External links 
The Yarn Harlot (blog)
Tricoteuses sans Frontières (Knitters without Borders)
2006 Knitting Olympics Participants
I Knit Day 2008

1968 births
Living people
Canadian bloggers
Canadian humorists
Canadian women non-fiction writers
Writers from Toronto
People in knitting
Canadian women bloggers
Women humorists